This is a discography of American songwriter, folk singer, humorist, and actor Loudon Wainwright III.

Studio albums

Loudon Wainwright III (1970)
Album II (1971)
Album III (1972)
Attempted Mustache (1973)
Unrequited (1975)
T Shirt (1976)
Final Exam (1978)
Fame and Wealth (1983)
I'm Alright (1985)
More Love Songs (1986)
Therapy (1989)
History (1992)
Grown Man (1995)
Little Ship (1997)
Social Studies (1999)
Last Man on Earth (2001)
Here Come the Choppers (2005)
Strange Weirdos (2007)
Recovery (2008)
High Wide & Handsome: The Charlie Poole Project (2009)
10 Songs for the New Depression (2010)
Older Than My Old Man Now (2012)
Haven't Got the Blues (Yet) (2014)
Surviving Twin (2017)
I'd Rather Lead a Band (2020)
Lifetime Achievement (2022)

Live albums

A Live One (1979)
Career Moves (1993)
The BBC Sessions (recorded 1971 - 1993, released 1998)
So Damn Happy (2003)
Nine Is The Cloud (2021)

Bootlegs
Live at the Cactus Cafe (recorded 1990, released 2013)
Late Night Calls (recorded 1972, released 2015)

Compilations
One Man Guy: The Best of Loudon Wainwright III 1982–1986 (1994, Music Club, UK)
The Atlantic Recordings (1999, Rhino Handmade). 
Dead Skunk: The Complete Columbia Years (2007, Acadia, UK)
Essential Recordings: One Man Guy (Best of Rounder Records Perfect 10 Series) (2009, Rounder Records)
40 Odd Years (2011, Shout! Factory)
Years in the Making (2018, StorySound Records)

Singles
"Dead Skunk" / "Needless to Say" (Columbia 45726, 1973) (U.S. pop #16)
"Say That You Love Me" / "New Paint" (Columbia 45849, 1973)
"Down Drinking at the Bar" / "I Am the Way" (Columbia 45949, 1974)
"Bell Bottom Pants" / "The Swimming Song" (Columbia 46064, 1974)
"Dead Skunk" / "Bell Bottom Pants" (Columbia Hall of Fame 33269, 1975)
"Bicentennial" / "Talking Big Apple '75" (Arista 0174, 1976)
"Final Exam" / "Golfin' Blues" (Arista 0340, 1978)
"Dead Skunk" / "Bell Bottom Pants" (Collectables 33269, 1980)
"Five Years Old" / "Rambunctious" (Demon UK 1016, 1983)
"Cardboard Boxes" / "Colours" (Demon UK 1039, 1985)
"Unhappy Anniversary" / "The Acid Song" (Demon UK 1044, 1986)
"Thank You, Girl" (John Hiatt) / "My Girl" (with John Hiatt) (Demon UK 1050, 1987)
"Your Mother and I" / "At the End of a Long Lonely Day" (with John Hiatt) (Demon UK 1051, 1987)
"T.S.D.H.A.V." / "Nice Guys" (Silvertone ORE 15, 1989)
"Jesse Don't Like It" (live) / "T.S.D.H.A.V." (live) (Hannibal 0705, 1990)
"Silent Night, Holy Night" (Terry Callier) / "The Little Drummer Boy" (John Scofield & Loudon Wainwright) (Verve, 1999)
"Y2K" (Rykodisc, 1999)
"Nanny" (Evangeline 4090, 2005)

Promotional discs
"Bell Bottom Pants" (mono) / "Bell Bottom Pants" (stereo), 1973, Columbia, 45 rpm
"The Swimming Song" (stereo) / "The Swimming Song" (mono), 1973, Columbia, 45 rpm
"Bicentennial" (mono) / "Bicentennial" (stereo), 1976, Arista, 45 rpm
"This Year", 1988, Silvertone, 45 rpm (one-sided disc)
"Y2K" 6-track, radio edits of the song, Rykodisc
"History Promo #1" ("Talking New Bob Dylan", "Hitting You", "People in Love"), 1992, Virgin
"History Promo #2" ('The Doctor", "When I'm at Your House", "So Many Songs", "Men"), 1992, Virgin
"History Promo #3" ("People in Love"), 1992, Virgin
Career Moves promo ("Suddenly It's Christmas"), 1993, Virgin
Grown Man promo ("IWIWAL [I Wish I Was a Lesbian]", "Cobwebs", "Grown Man"), 1994, Virgin
Little Ship promo, ("Mr. Ambivalent"), Virgin, 1997
So Damn Happy promo 1 ("Something for Nothing"), 2003, Sanctuary
So Damn Happy promo 2 ("The Picture", "The Shit Song" [radio edit], "You Never Phone"), 2003, Sanctuary
"Daughter", from Strange Weirdos, 2007, Concord

Other appearances
 The Earl Scruggs Revue,  Anniversary Special, Volume One – "Swimming Song", "Gospel Ship" (cover) (1975, Columbia Records )
 Nederlands Blazers Ensemble, Si Dolce (live) –  "I Am the Way", "The Last Day" (unreleased), "Road Ode", "Five Years Old" (2000, VPRO Eigenwijs)
Various Artists: Live Appearances
 Nyon Folk Festival 1979 – "The Waitress Song" (unreleased) (1979, Gat)
 Feed the Folk – "Outsidey" (1985, Temple Records)
 KGSR Broadcasts– "The Back Nine" (1993, KGSR)
 KBCO Studio C, Volume 4 – "Cardboard Boxes" (1994, KBCO)
 The Best of Mountain Stage Live, Volume 1 – "Bill of Goods" (1996, Blue Plate Music)
 KGSR Broadcasts Vol. 4– "Cobwebs" (1996, KGSR)
 The Best of the Cambridge Folk Festival – medley: "The Swimming Song"–"Pretty Little Martha"–"Dump the Dog" (1998, Strange Fruit Records)
 KGSR Broadcasts Vol. 6– "Little Ship" (1998, KGSR)
 Live at the World Cafe: Volume 9 – "Sunday Times" (1999, World Cafe)
 Seka ["Sister"] Vol. 2 – "Pretty Good Day" (2000, Twah!)
 KGSR Broadcasts Vol.10 – "No Sure Way" (2002, KGSR)
Fresh Air in Concert – "Your Mother and I" (2003, NPR)
KBCO Studio C, 20th Anniversary Edition – "White Winos" (2008, KBCO)
Various Artists: Studio Contributions
All covers except as noted
 The Slugger's Wife Soundtrack – "Hey, Hey, My My" (with Rebecca De Mornay) (1985, MCA Records)
 From Hell to Obscurity (single B-sides) – "Colours", "At the End of a Long Lonely Day" (with John Hiatt), "My Girl" (with John Hiatt) (1989, Blackmail)
 Signed Sealed Delivered Vol. 3 – "Virgin 21" (unreleased original) (1994, Virgin)
 Beat the Retreat: Songs by Richard Thompson – "A Heart Needs a Home" (with Shawn Colvin) (1995, Capitol)
 Bleecker Street: Greenwich Village in the 60's – "Pack Up Your Sorrows" (with Iris DeMent) (1999, Astor Place)
 Love Songs For New York: Wish You Were Here – "No Sure Way" (original) (2002, Megaforce)
 The Aviator: Music from the Motion Picture – "After You've Gone" (2004, Columbia/Sony Music Soundtrax)
 Rogue's Gallery: Pirate Ballads, Sea Songs, and Chanteys – "Turkish Revelry", "Good Ship Venus" (2006, ANTI-)
 Boardwalk Empire Volume 1: Music from the HBO Original Series – "Carrickfergus" (2011, Elektra/Asylum)
 Boardwalk Empire Volume 2: Music from the HBO Original Series – "The Prisoner's Song" (2013, ABKCO)
 30 Days, 30 Songs - "I Had a Dream" (original) (2016)
Album Tracks on Compilations and Soundtracks
 The New Age of Atlantic – "Motel Blues" (1972, Atlantic Records)
 Dr. Demento Presents The Greatest Novelty Records of All Time: Volume 4: The 1970s – "Dead Skunk" (1985, Rhino)
 Super Hits of the '70s: Have a Nice Day, Vol. 10 – "Dead Skunk" (1990, Rhino)
 Hitchin' a Ride: 70's Greatest Rock Hits, Volume 10 – "Dead Skunk" (1991, Priority Records)
 Life in the Folk Lane II – "Hard Day on the Planet" (1994, Diablo Records)
 Troubadours of the Folk Era, Vol. 4: The '70s – "Old Friend" (1995, Rhino)
 Golfs [sic] Greatest Hits – "Golfin' Blues" (1996, Teed Off Records, distributed by BMG)
 Mellow Rock Hits of the '70s: Sundown – "Glad to See You've Got Religion" (1997, Rhino)
 Soft Rock Classics – "Glad to See You've Got Religion" (1998, Rhino) (3-disk re-package including previous item) 
 Family Album – "The Picture" (1998, Gadfly)
 Welcome to High Sierra – "Primrose Hill" (1998, Popmafia)
 Unconditionally Guaranteed Volume 7 (August 1999): Uncut's Guide to the Month's Best Music – "Pretty Good Day" (1999, Uncut Magazine)
 28 Days: Original Motion Picture Soundtrack – "Heaven and Mud", "Drinking Song", "White Winos", "Dreaming" (2000, Uni/Varèse Sarabande)
 Washington Square Memoirs: The Great Urban Folk Boom (1950–1970) – "School Days" (2001, Rhino)
 Chart-Topping Crazy Hits – "Dead Skunk" (2004, Compass Productions / Warner Special products)
 Golden Slumbers: A Father's Love – "Daughter" (2005, Rendezvous Records)
 Roll With It: 16 Songs About Drinking, Dope, and Disorderly Conduct – "Drinking Song" (2008,  Uncut Magazine)

See also
 Martha Wainwright discography
 Rufus Wainwright discography

References

Wainwright, Loudon
Folk music discographies